Ferdinand III of Limburg Stirum was the son of Ferdinand I of Limburg Stirum and Katharina Karoline von Eptingen. Born in 1753, he died at the age of 15 in 1768.

1753 births
1768 deaths
Ferdinand 03